Situ Guong (born 26 September 1911, date of death unknown) was a Chinese athlete. He competed in the men's long jump and the men's triple jump at the 1936 Summer Olympics.

References

1911 births
Year of death missing
Athletes (track and field) at the 1936 Summer Olympics
Chinese male long jumpers
Chinese male triple jumpers
Olympic athletes of China
Place of birth missing